Franci Demšar (born 4 February 1960) is a Slovenian physicist and politician.

From 4 February 1999 to 7 June 2000, he served as Minister of Defence of the Republic of Slovenia. He had previously been Secretary of State at the Ministry of Science and Technology.

He is currently director of the Public Agency for Research of the Republic of Slovenia.

References

1960 births
Living people
Slovenian physicists
Place of birth missing (living people)
Defence ministers of Slovenia